Ismaeel Mohammad (born 5 April 1990) is a Qatari professional footballer who currently plays as a midfielder for Al-Duhail in the Qatar Stars League and the Qatar national football team.

International career

International goals
Scores and results list Qatar's goal tally first.

Honours

Club 
Al-Duhail
Qatar Stars League: 2011–12, 2013–14, 2014–15, 2016–17, 2017–18, 2019–20
Qatar Cup: 2013, 2015, 2018
Sheikh Jassim Cup: 2015, 2016
Emir of Qatar Cup: 2016, 2018, 2019, 2022

International 
Qatar
 WAFF Championship: 2014
 Gulf Cup of Nations: 2014

References

External links 
 
 
 

1990 births
Living people
Qatari footballers
Naturalised citizens of Qatar
Qatari people of Saudi Arabian descent
Saudi Arabian emigrants to Qatar
El Jaish SC players
Lekhwiya SC players
Al-Duhail SC players
Qatar Stars League players
Qatari Second Division players
Qatar international footballers
Association football forwards
2015 AFC Asian Cup players
2021 CONCACAF Gold Cup players
2022 FIFA World Cup players